Crash Test 02 is the second and final album by Italian band Bloom 06. After many delays, the album was finally released on May 23, 2008. Like their first album, Crash Test 01, this album features lyrics in both English and Italian.

Crash Test 02 previews
Prior to the album's release, Bloom 06 released multiple previews of various songs from their album on their MySpace page. The first song was Between the Lines, on February 12, 2008. After strong response from their fans, 3 other previews were added, Anche solo per un attimo, Un'altra come te, and Welcome to the Zoo.

After the album's release, You're Amazing and Fall were added to the available preview list.

Singles

"Un'altra come te" was the album's first single, released 2 May 2008. "Between the Lines" was featured as the first track on the band's EP "Club Test 01". An English version of "Un'altra come te" was released in January 2009.

Track list

* English translations not official.

External links
Bloom 06 website
Bloom 06's Official MySpace

References 

2008 albums